This is a list of films that feature the Greek divine hero Hercules. During the 1950s and 1960s, a series of films featuring Hercules were produced in Italy.

List of films

American productions

Italian productions

See also
Hercules: The Animated Series, TV series based on the Disney film

References

Lists of films by common content